Gods of War Live is the third live album by heavy metal band Manowar. It was recorded in 2007 during the band's tour promoting the Gods of War album.

Track listing

Personnel
Eric Adams - vocals
Karl Logan - guitars
Joey DeMaio - bass
Scott Columbus - drums

Additional personnel
Joe Rozler - keyboards
Wolfgang Schmidt - organ

Charts

Manowar albums
2007 live albums